Evadi Gola Vaadidhi is a 2005 Telugu language comedy film directed by E.V.V. Satyanarayana. It stars Aryan Rajesh and Deepika supported by Chalapathi Rao, Brahmanandam, Kondavalasa,Ali and Jaya Prakash Reddy. This film was a  hit and ran for 100 days in many theaters.

Synopsis
Veera Shankar falls in love with Arti at first sight. Veera Shankar is due to marry the daughter of Rayalaseema factionist Bakka Reddy. Bakka Reddy summon goons to kill Arti. Veera Shankar travels to Bangkok and stays in a hotel owned by Telugu people, where he encounters a flurry of strange, interrelated incidents. These incidents are somehow connected to Veera Shankar. The rest of the film is about how these characters find solace.

Cast

Aryan Rajesh as Veera Shankar
Deepika as Arti 
Chalapathi Rao as Sairam, Hotel Owner at Bangkok
Brahmanandam Shankar Dada RMP
Dharmavarapu Subramanyam as Apparao
Kondavalasa as Bakka Reddy
Jaya Prakash Reddy as Banda Reddy
Ali as Alankar DSP
Babu Mohan as Seetharam, Hotel Owner at Bangkok
Chittajalu Lakshmipati as Brahmanandam's Assistant
Krishna Bhagavan as Gowri Shankar a.k.a. Kadapa Reddemma Husband
Mallikarjuna Rao as Murthy
L.B. Sriram as Chain smoker Gangadhar
Kovai Sarala as Leela Rani
Telangana Shakuntala as Kadapa Reddamma, Krishna Bagavan wife
Harika
Babloo as Hotel Server
Bangkok Bobby as Room Service staff
Jyothi as Dharmavarapu Wife, Ali Lover
Geetha Singh as Bakka Reddy's Daughter
Abhinayashree (Cameo Appearance)
Jayalalita (Cameo Appearance)

Music

Lyrics: Surendra Krishna, VariKuppala Yadagiri, Srihari Jagannath,
"Bandaru Danaiah" was written by "Kala Kadu Ga Cheliya". Sung by Karthik (male) and Sadhana Sargam (female).
"Bandaru Danaiah" or "Bandaru Danaiah kavi also featured in Krishnamma Kalipindi Eddharini. in this movie one Special song written "Naa adha" singer is "Karthik" Bandaru Danaiah Kavi "He chitra patama" Song lyrics Bandaru Danaiah Kavi, Also Bandaru Danaiah.  Movie name is "Sathi Thimmamamba" this movie music director Bandaru Danaiah Kavi.  "Vikramarkudu" in this movie one song written by Bandaru Danaiah, song name is "Dooranga"
Music: Kamalakar

Reception
Evadi Gola Vadidi went on to become a successful film by amazing everybody with good collections. This film ran for 50 days in 26 centers. The 50 days function of EVV Satyanarayana's Evadigola Vadidi was held at Sudarshan 70mm in Hyderabad on 13th March 2005. The function was attended by most of the cast and crewmembers. Special guests for the evening were L Rajagopal, M P Vijaywada and D Ramanaidu.

Home Media
This film is available in Amazon Prime for the rental subscription

References

External links
Evadi Gola Vadidi 175 Days Function
Review At MSN

2005 films
2005 comedy films
2000s Telugu-language films
Films directed by E. V. V. Satyanarayana
Indian comedy films